Ewa Rydell (born 26 February 1942) is a Swedish former artistic gymnast who won two medals at the 1963 European Championships. She competed at the 1960 and 1964 Olympics and finished in the 11th and 8th place with the Swedish team, respectively. Her father Sven Rydell won a bronze medal in football at the 1924 Olympics.

References

1942 births
Living people
Sportspeople from Gothenburg
Gymnasts at the 1960 Summer Olympics
Gymnasts at the 1964 Summer Olympics
Olympic gymnasts of Sweden
Swedish female artistic gymnasts
European champions in gymnastics
20th-century Swedish women